One World is the fourth studio album by rock band Rare Earth and was released in June 1971. "I Just Want to Celebrate" became a Top 10 Gold certified hit, and the album would become the third (and final) Gold album from the ensemble.

On June 9, 2015 the album was released in CD format for the first time, as a remastered, limited, collector's edition digipak with the original gatefold cover.

Track listing

Side one
 "What'd I Say" (Ray Charles) – 7:15
 "If I Die" (Pete Rivera) – 3:32
 "The Seed" (Rivera) – 3:34
 "I Just Want to Celebrate" (Dino Fekaris, Nick Zesses) – 3:35

Side two
 "Someone to Love" (Gil Bridges) – 3:48
 "Any Man Can Be a Fool" (John Persh) – 3:36
 "The Road" (Tom Baird) – 3:35
 "Under God's Light" (Eddie Guzman, Ray Monette, Mark Olson) – 4:52

Charts

Personnel
Rare Earth
Gil Bridges – woodwinds, backing vocals, percussion, flute
Ray Monette – guitars, backing vocals
Mark Olson – keyboards, backing vocals
John Persh – bass guitar, backing vocals
Pete Rivera – drums, lead vocals, percussion
Ed Guzman – conga, percussion

References

Rare Earth (band) albums
1971 albums
Motown albums